Walter Scott "Mike" Milligan (May 27, 1904 – January 1, 1979) was an American football player and coach of football and basketball. He served as the head football coach at the University of Pittsburgh from 1947 to 1949 and for one season as the head basketball coach at the University of Tulsa (1942–43).

Playing days
Milligan played high school football at Aliquippa High School and Kiski School. While at college at the University of Pittsburgh, Milligan played guard from 1929 to 1931 under the school's legendary coach Jock Sutherland. The lightest of Pitt guards in 1930, and listed at a height of 5 feet, 10 inches and weighing 168 pounds, Milligan broke into the lineup at left guard when Hart Morris was injured in an October 11 game at Western Reserve. The teams on which Milligan played while at Pitt were regional powers and nationally regarded. The 1929 Pitt team went undefeated in the regular season and won the Eastern Championship and appeared in the Rose Bowl losing to USC. The loss did not prevent football historian Parke H. Davis from naming Pitt as that season's national champion. The following season, Milligan's first as a regular starter, saw the Panthers go 6–2–1. This was followed by an 8–1 finish in 1931 in which the Panthers recorded six shutouts, including a 40–0 dismantling of Nebraska. That season also saw Pitt defeat Penn State in State College, using only one first-string player, by a score of 41–6 en route to winning the Eastern Championship. These accomplishments would prompt Parke Davis to again name the Panthers national champions. During his summers in college, Milligan worked as a desk sergeant with the Aliquippa  Police Department.

Coaching career
As a coach, Milligan held several assistant football coaching positions during his career, in which he typically specialized in coaching the lines. He had his only tenure as a head football coach for three seasons at his alma mater, the University of Pittsburgh. Milligan served one season as the head coach for the basketball team at Tulsa, where he also served as a football assistant.

Early years
Milligan became an assistant coach at Pitt under head coach Jock Sutherland in 1934. He remained a coach at the university, where he served as the coach of the football program's freshman squad, until he quit shortly after the resignation of Sutherland in 1938. From there Milligan took an assistant coaching position at Florida which was followed by an assistant position at Tulsa where he served as the offensive line coach.

Tulsa basketball head coach
While at Tulsa, Milligan took over head basketball coaching duties from Tex Ryon who left in 1942 after his second stint coaching the team.  Milligan was winless in his basketball coaching tenure at Tulsa, where he went 0–10 during the 1942-43 season.  Milligan was replaced as the Tulsa's basketball coach the following year by Woody West.

Pitt football head coach

Milligan returned to his alma mater in 1946 as a top assistant for Pitt under head coach Wes Fesler, who left after his only season at Pitt to coach his alma mater Ohio State. Fesler's departure opened the door for Milligan's promotion to the head coaching position. Milligan's head coaching tenure at Pitt was underscored by one of the most satisfying wins in Pitt history when the Panthers defeated the Fesler-coached Ohio State team 12–0 for their only win of the 1947 season.  Milligan brought Pitt back to winning records in 1948 and 1949, achieving consecutive 6–3 seasons that included appearances in the national rankings and back-to-back shutouts of Penn State, the first of which snapped Penn State's 17-game unbeaten streak. After Pitt, a twenty-point underdog, defeated defending Rose Bowl champion Northwestern on the road on October 1, 1949, Milligan was named the United Press "Coach of the Week". At the end of the 1949 season, he was also nominated for the Scripps-Howard "Coach of the Year" award. However, Milligan resigned on January 27, 1950, due to a perceived snub by the university offering him only a one-year contract, and he never returned to a head coaching position.

Later years
Following his stint as the Pitt head coach, Milligan took a series of assistant football coaching positions and was a highly regarded as a line coach. He spent a year as an assistant at USC in 1950, was an assistant at Purdue from 1951 to 1952, and then moved to an assistant position at Nebraska beginning from 1953 to 1955.

Death
Milligan died on January 1, 1979, at a hospital in Pittsburgh, Pennsylvania.

Head coaching record

Football

References

External links
 

1904 births
1979 deaths
American football guards
Basketball coaches from Pennsylvania
Florida Gators football coaches
Nebraska Cornhuskers football coaches
People from Aliquippa, Pennsylvania
Pittsburgh Panthers football coaches
Pittsburgh Panthers football players
Players of American football from Pennsylvania
Purdue Boilermakers football coaches
Sportspeople from the Pittsburgh metropolitan area
Tulsa Golden Hurricane football coaches
Tulsa Golden Hurricane men's basketball coaches
USC Trojans football coaches